John Tournour (born November 23, 1965 in New York City, New York), better known as JT the Brick, is a sports talk radio host based in Las Vegas, Nevada. He currently hosts "Brick at Night With JT the Brick" on Sirius XM Satellite Radio's Mad Dog Sports Radio, a show on KRLV in Las Vegas, and various programs for the Las Vegas Raiders including the team's radio pregame show. Tournour graduated from SUNY Geneseo in 1987 with a degree in Speech Communication.  He was also president of Delta Kappa Tau fraternity and a member of the rugby team.

Career
Tournour, a former stockbroker, got his start in sports radio after becoming a frequent caller to The Jim Rome Show. After winning the inaugural "Smack-Off" in 1995, Tournour was offered a job hosting a late-night Sunday show at KMAX-Los Angeles.

From there, Tournour moved his show to KFMB-San Diego, where he only spent a few weeks before being offered a show on the now-defunct Las Vegas-based Sports Fan Radio Network. Tournour's late-night show lasted five years, until the network's demise in 2001. While working in Las Vegas, he called the very first game of the original XFL featuring the Las Vegas Outlaws over local radio. During this time, he also hosted an afternoon show on San Francisco-based radio station KNBR.  At one time, KNBR had Tournour for his local show, his four-hour national show, and an overnight replay of at least a portion of that national show before the next broadcast day began.

In June 2001, Tournour landed at the upstart Fox Sports Radio, hosting an afternoon show. He was later moved to the evening, hosting a late-night syndicated sports show on SportsFan Radio Network. The show was shifted to 3 pm Pacific, 6 pm Eastern, in 2012.

Tournour also hosted, until the end of the 2005 season, a Sunday night show, Fox Sunday Game Time React, where he discussed the football games of the day with Bryan Cox. This was eventually replaced by a similar show hosted by John Fricke and Chris Landry.

He previously hosted a show that aired weekdays from 5pm to 8pm Pacific time (8pm to 11pm Eastern) on Fox Sports Radio. The primary focus of his Fox Sports Radio program was the NFL, and, on Friday nights during the season and playoffs, he called for at least one caller from every NFL team (during the playoffs, those in the playoffs) to answer his "NFL Roll Call". Fox Sports announced on Sept. 11, 2018 that Tournour and producer Steve Gorman were let go by the network.

Tournour made a guest appearance on CNBC's The Big Idea with Donny Deutsch on June 26, 2006, to discuss the feud between Chicago Sun-Times columnist Jay Mariotti, and Chicago White Sox skipper Ozzie Guillén.

The JT the Brick Show
Tomm Looney, the voice of The Best Damn Sports Show Period, works alongside Tournour on the show. Looney is best known for providing the two-times-hourly sports updates and for hosting the entertainment segment of the show which is called "Pop Looney."

In addition to his hosting duties, Tournour was for a time regular sports columnist for MSNBC.com.

Brick at Night with JT The Brick 
On October 8, 2019 JT began hosting his own late night show, "Brick at Night With JT the Brick." on Sirius XM‘s Mad Dog Sports Radio. The show airs Sunday through Thursday nights at 11PM - 3AM eastern (8 PM - 12 AM Pacific).

Origin of nickname
The nickname "the Brick" comes from his time as a caller to The Jim Rome Show. A "brick" is a common slang term in basketball for a shot that bounces off the backboard. Rome often referred to Tournour's favorite team, the New York Knicks, as the "Bricks".

Relationship with Jim Rome
Tournour made himself available for an extensive interview in Alan Eisenstock's 2001 book, Sports Talk (Rome declined numerous requests for an interview for the same book). In the interview, Tournour details his decision to leave a six-figure income as a stockbroker to chase his dream of talking sports for a living. He also weighs in on his relationship with Rome:

On July 4, 2019, Tournour guest hosted for Jim Rome for the first time ever.

Family 
Tournour purchased a residence in Summerlin, Nevada with his wife Julie and his two sons on January 7, 2010.

References 

1965 births
American sports announcers
Living people
Radio personalities from New York City
People from Summerlin, Nevada
Las Vegas Raiders announcers
Oakland Raiders announcers
American stockbrokers